Stephen Lowe (born December 1947) is an English playwright and director.

Lowe's plays have dealt with subjects ranging from the takeover of Tibet by the Chinese People's Liberation Army in 1959 (Tibetan Inroads) to a dying DH Lawrence trying find a publisher for Lady Chatterley (Empty Bed Blues); from Donald McGill postcards (Cards and Kisses on the Bottom) to Dr John Dee (The Alchemical Wedding).  His best known plays are Touched, about a group of working-class women in Nottingham at the end of the second world war; The Ragged Trousered Philanthropists, about a group of house-painters in 1906 (adapted from the novel by Robert Tressell); and Old Big ‘Ead in the Spirit of the Man, in which football hero Brian Clough comes back from the dead to inspire a playwright working on his latest play.

He has had plays produced by the Royal Court, Royal Shakespeare Company, Riverside Studios, Theatre Royal Stratford East, Hampstead Theatre, Joint Stock; and at regional theatres across the country including Scarborough Theatre in the Round, Sheffield Crucible, Liverpool Playhouse, Derby Playhouse, Birmingham Rep, Salisbury Playhouse and Plymouth Theatre Royal. A two-man adaptation by Townsend Productions of his play The Ragged Trousered Philanthropists toured throughout the country in 2011 to 2013 and again in 2015.

Many of his plays were first produced in his home-town at Nottingham Playhouse, at Lakeside Arts Centre or by Lowe’s own company, Meeting Ground Theatre Company.   Lowe moved back to Nottingham in 1985 to start Meeting Ground, with a group including his wife Tanya Myers.  In February 2017, a revival of Touched was staged at Nottingham Playhouse, starring Vicky McClure. This new production celebrated the fortieth anniversary of the original production at the same theatre.

Lowe has worked with many leading directors including Bill Alexander, Alan Ayckbourn, Annie Castledine, Jonathan Chadwick, Anthony Clark, Stephen Daldry, Alan Dossor, Richard Eyre, Bill Gaskill, David Leveaux,  and Danny Boyle, who early in his career was assistant director on Lowe’s play Tibetan Inroads.   His theatre and television work has featured actors such as Bruce Alexander, Warren Clarke, George Costigan, Kenneth Cranham, Sharon Duce, Emma Fielding, Brian Glover, Nigel Hawthorne, Bill Paterson, Neil Pearson, Kathryn Pogson, Linus Roache, Colin Tarrant, Marjorie Yates, Harriet Walter and Rachel Weisz.

Lowe was writer in residence at Riverside Studios from 1982 to 1984, and he has led numerous theatre and writing workshops, including at the National Theatre, the Royal Shakespeare Company, BBC Television, the Arvon Foundation, Liverpool Playhouse, Nottingham Playhouse and Riverside Studios.  He has lectured at Dartington College of Arts, Birmingham University (on the MA in Playwriting Studies programme), Nottingham Trent University, Charles University in Prague and at the Performance Art Academy in Sofia.   Lowe has been a member of various theatre boards and advisory panels, including Great Eastern Stage Company.  He was on the council of Arts Council England, and was Chair of Arts Council England - East Midlands from 2004 to 2010.

Lowe's play Touched was joint winner of the George Devine Award in 1977, and he was awarded an honorary doctorate by the University of Nottingham in July 2011. In July 2015, Nottingham Express Transit named one of their new trams "Stephen Lowe" in his honour.

Early life
Lowe was born Stephen James Wright in Sneinton, Nottingham, where his father was a labourer and his mother was a machinist in Nottingham's Lace Market. He graduated from Birmingham University in English and Theatre Studies.

After university, Lowe worked in various jobs while writing, including part-time lecturer, clerk, hospital receptionist, newspaper distributor, advertising manager, housepainter, barman and civil servant.  While working as a part-time shepherd in the Yorkshire Dales, he was commissioned by Alan Ayckbourn to write a comedy double-bill, Comic Pictures, and joined his Scarborough Theatre in the Round company as an actor and writer.  Ayckbourn produced Comic Pictures in 1976.

Lowe took his mother's maiden name as a professional identity in 1976, when he joined Ayckbourn's company.

Peace plays
In the 1980s, Lowe edited two anthologies of peace plays for Methuen.  The first volume was of plays by British playwrights, including Deborah Levy, Adrian Mitchell, and Lowe himself (Keeping Body and Soul Together).  It was published in 1985 during a period of increased tension towards the end of the Cold War, and Lowe's introduction quoted from Gabriel Garcia Marquez's Nobel acceptance speech, "we, the inventors of tales, who will believe anything, feel entitled to believe that it is not yet too late to engage in the creation of a utopia of a very different kind."  The second volume, published in 1990, came out of the new era of glasnost and a thaw in relations between the two superpowers.  For this volume Lowe selected plays by two American playwrights, Arthur Kopit and Richard Stayton; and by two Russian playwrights, Fyodor Burlatsky, a former adviser to Khrushchev and Gorbachev, and Mikhail Bulgakov.

Works

Plays
   Cards, Act Inn Theatre, London (1973)
   Comic Pictures (Stars and Cards), Scarborough Theatre-in-the-Round (1976)
   Shooting Fishing and Riding, Scarborough Theatre-in-the-Round (1977)
   Touched, Nottingham Playhouse (1977); Royal Court (1981)
   Sally Ann Hallelujah Band, Nottingham Playhouse Theatre Roundabout (1978)
   The Ragged Trousered Philanthropists, Joint Stock (1978)
   Glasshouses, Royal Court Theatre Upstairs  (1981) ; (later retitled:) Moving Pictures, Leeds Playhouse
   Tibetan Inroads, Royal Court (1981)
   The Trial of Frankenstein, Plymouth Theatre Royal (1982)
   Strive, Sheffield Crucible Studio (1983)
   Seachange, Riverside Studios (1984)
   Keeping Body and Soul Together, Royal Court Theatre Upstairs (1984)
   The Storm (adaptation, from Ostrovsky), RSC Barbican The Pit (1985)
   Desire, Meeting Ground Theatre national tour (1986)
   Demon Lovers, Meeting Ground Theatre national tour (1987)
   William Tell (adaptation, from Schiller), Sheffield Crucible (1987)
   Divine Gossip, RSC Barbican The Pit (1988)
   Paradise, Nottingham Playhouse (1990)
   The Alchemical Wedding, Salisbury Playhouse (1998)
   Revelations, Hampstead Theatre (2003)
   It's Not Personal, Nottingham Playhouse (2004)
   Old Big 'Ead in The Spirit of the Man, Nottingham Playhouse and national tour (2005-6)
   The Fox and the Little Vixen, Tangere Arts tour (2005)
   The Devil's League, in rehearsal at Derby Playhouse when theatre went into receivership; not yet produced (2008)
   Smile, Lakeside Arts Nottingham (2008)
   Glamour, Nottingham Playhouse (2009)
   Empty Bed Blues, Lakeside Arts Nottingham (2009)
   Seance on a Sunday Afternoon, Lakeside Arts Nottingham (2011)
   Just a Gigolo, Edinburgh Festival and Lakeside Arts Nottingham (2012)
   Altitude Sickness, rehearsed reading, Lakeside Arts Nottingham (2016)

Screenplays
  Cries From A Watchtower, BBC TV Play for Today (1979) Producer Richard Eyre. - A small-time watchmaker is hit by the new silicon chip technology.
  Fred Karno's Bloody Circus, rehearsed reading by the Royal Shakespeare Company, Warehouse Theatre (1979); part of Plays that Television Would Not Do series.
 Shades, BBC 2 60 minutes as part of PLAYS FOR TOMORROW series (1981). - The youth of 2001 re-connect with 80's Peace Protestors. Starring Neil Pearson.
 Unstable Elements, Film NewsReel/ Channel 4. (1983)
 Kisses on the Bottom, BBC 2 (1984). - A comedy in which the characters of Donald McGill sea-side postcards come alive (adapted from Lowe's play Cards).
 Tell Tale Hearts, Three part thriller BBC Scotland (1990) Starring Emma Fielding, Bill Patterson. Directed by Thaddeus O'Sullivan. - Investigations of a serial child murderer expose hidden fears in all involved.
 Ice Dance, BBC 1 (1990).  Director Alan Dossor. Starring Warren Clarke. Producer Mike Wearing. - Two young Nottingham kids try to emulate Torvill and Dean.
 Flea Bites, BBC 1 (1992).  Director Alan Dossor. starring Nigel Hawthorne. Producer Mike Wearing. - A Survivor of the camps teaches a young boy the mystery of a flea-circus.
 Scarlet & Black, BBC classical Four hour adaptation (1993).  Director Ben Bolt. Starring Ewan McGregor and Rachel Weisz. Producer Mike Wearing. - Stendhal's masterpiece of young love & passion
 Greenstone, ABC/ NZ TV. Eight-hour historical drama with Communicado, the New Zealand producers of Once Were Warriors. (1999). - The 'adventure' story of the first white settlers and the subsequent colonisation of the land.

Directing
   Shooting Fishing and Riding, Scarborough Theatre-in-the-Round (1977)
   Strive, Meeting Ground Theatre national tour (1985)
   Desire, Meeting Ground Theatre national tour (1986)
   Demon Lovers, Meeting Ground Theatre national tour (1987)
   Inside Out of Mind by Tanya Myers, Meeting Ground Theatre workshop presentation for Nottingham Institute of Mental Health (2011)

Sources
 Faith, hope, and human decency, interview with Lowe by John Cunningham;  The Guardian, 19 Jan 1981; p9.
 Lowe, Stephen, Who's Who 2011, A & C Black, 2011; online edn, Oxford University Press, Dec 2010 ; online edn, Oct 2010.
 Moving Pictures, Four Plays by Stephen Lowe. London, Methuen, 1985.
 Old Big 'Ead in The Spirit of the Man, by Stephen Lowe.  London, Methuen, 2005.
 Work CV, Stephen Lowe website
 Lowe, Stephen. Entry by Dan Rebellato, in Companion to 20th Century Theatre, edited by Colin Chambers. Continuum International, 2002; p 457.
 www.insideoutofmind.co.uk
 New play focuses on role of carers, article from Nottingham Evening Post website, 27 Jul 2011.
 Donohue, Walter (edited), The Warehouse: A Writer's Theatre. Theatre Papers no. 8, Dartington College of Arts, 1980.

References

External links
Stephen Lowe's website
Methuen edition of Old Big 'Ead...
Press reviews of Smile and Empty Bed Blues onLakeside Arts Centre website
Inside Out of Mind website

People from Sneinton
1947 births
English dramatists and playwrights
Living people
Alumni of the University of Birmingham
English male dramatists and playwrights